Marianao is one of the 15 municipalities or boroughs (municipios in Spanish) in the city of Havana, Cuba. It lies 6 miles southwest of the original city of Havana, with which it is connected by the Marianao railway. In 1989 the municipality had a population of 133,016. Marianao is on a range of hills of about 1500 above sea level and is noted for its salubrious climate. The city dates back to 1830.

Overview
As Havana expanded during the 1930s and 1940s, Marianao became a suburb of the city.

A famous landmark is the monument built to honor Carlos Juan Finlay, a doctor who helped eradicate yellow fever in Cuba in the 19th century. It is shaped like a syringe. The monument is at the junction of Calles 100 and 31, close to several major hospitals.

Marianao is home to the famous Tropicana Club and was home to the Oriental Park Racetrack.
One of the most notable foods made in Marianao is "Pollo A La Barbacoa".

Personalities
Alicia Alonso, prima ballerina assoluta 
Camilo Marin, jockey agent
Maria Teresa, Grand Duchess of Luxembourg, spouse of the current Grand Duke of Luxembourg
Jorge Enrique González Pacheco, poet and cultural entrepreneur
Luis Tiant, baseball player

Twin towns
 Carmen (Campeche, Mexico)
 Zapopan (Jalisco, Mexico)

References

External links

Details of municipality (Spanish)
El Obelisco de Marianao
Description of Marianao before the 1959 Revolution

Municipalities of Havana
1830 establishments in the Spanish Empire